Ryan Moore may refer to:

 Ryan Moore (American football) (born 1983), American football player
 Ryan Moore (golfer) (born 1982), American golfer
 Ryan Moore (jockey) (born 1983), English champion jockey
 Ryan Moore (musician), Canadian musician
 Ryan Moore (racing driver) (born 1983), American NASCAR driver
 Ryan Moore (soccer) (born 1986), American soccer player